Little Stony Petrel Island is an island game reserve with an area of 4 ha, in south-eastern Australia.  It is part of the Petrel Island Group, lying in Bass Strait close to Walker and Robbins Islands in north-west Tasmania.

Fauna
Recorded breeding seabird and shorebird species include little penguin, short-tailed shearwater, common diving-petrel, white-faced storm-petrel, Pacific gull and sooty oystercatcher.

References

Islands of Tasmania